Pablo González (born 2 July 1982) is a retired Colombian tennis player.

González has a career high ATP singles ranking of 299 achieved on 14 May 2007. He also has a career high doubles ranking of 240 achieved on 1 October 2007.

He made his main draw debut on the ATP Tour at the 2000 Bancolombia Open as a wild card in the singles competition.

He has been part of the Colombia Davis Cup team from 2000 until 2007. Since 2016, he is the captain of the Colombia Davis Cup Team.

ATP Challenger and ITF Futures finals

Singles: 9 (4–5)

Doubles: 21 (7–14)

References

External links
 
 

1982 births
Living people
Colombian male tennis players
Central American and Caribbean Games medalists in tennis
Central American and Caribbean Games bronze medalists for Colombia
Tennis players at the 2007 Pan American Games
Tennis players at the 2003 Pan American Games
Pan American Games competitors for Colombia
Sportspeople from Bogotá
20th-century Colombian people
21st-century Colombian people